Tauer (Sorbian: Turjej) is a municipality in the district of Spree-Neiße, in Lower Lusatia, Brandenburg, Germany.

History
The area is known to have been settled as early as the Bronze Age. The first written mention was in 1632 as Tawern Tauer. In 1652, it was known as the village of Taurow. From 1815 to 1947, Tauer was part of the Prussian Province of Brandenburg. From 1952 to 1990, it was part of the Bezirk Cottbus of East Germany.

Demography

References

External links

Community Portal

Populated places in Spree-Neiße